The men's aerials event in freestyle skiing at the 2014 Winter Olympics in Sochi, Russia took place 17 February 2014.

Results

Qualification 1
The qualification 1 was held at 17:45.

Qualification 2
The qualification 2 was held at 18:30.

Finals
The finals were started at 21:30.

References

Men's freestyle skiing at the 2014 Winter Olympics